The Boletaceae are a family of mushroom-forming fungi, primarily characterised by small pores on the spore-bearing hymenial surface (at the underside of the mushroom), instead of gills as are found in most agarics.  Nearly as widely distributed as the agarics, the family is renowned for hosting some prime edible species highly sought after by mushroom hunters worldwide, such as the cep or king bolete (Boletus edulis).  A number of rare or threatened species are also present in the family, that have become the focus of increasing conservation concerns. As a whole, the typical members of the family are commonly known as boletes.

Boletes are a group of mushrooms reasonably safe for human consumption, as none of them are known to be deadly to adults. Edible bolete species are especially suitable for novice collectors, since they pose little danger of being confused with deadly poisonous mushrooms, such as deadly Amanita species which bear gills instead of pores in their hymenial surface. Some boletes are toxic and may cause gastrointestinal poisoning if consumed, but these are unlikely to be confused with popular edible species in the family.

The family has been the subject of extensive systematic revisions in recent years, as some of the early established genera (particularly Boletus, Leccinum and Xerocomus), have revealed to be highly polyphyletic, and the original number of genera within the family had been underestimated. As a result, several new species and genera have been described from Asia, Europe and North America, while many existing species have been transferred to different genera, in concordance with phylogenetic results.

Description
Most species of Boletaceae produce large, fleshy mushrooms, with a more or less central stipe. The fruit bodies typically have tubular hymenophores, although a small number of species (e.g. Phylloporus) are lamellate.
The spore deposit colours are commonly  olivaceous (yellowish-green), yellowish, brownish, or vinaceous (red-wine coloured), and when viewed under the microscope spores are usually fusiform or subfusiform. In many species, parts of the fruit body will turn blue, red, or black when bruised or exposed to the air, as a result of the oxidation of pulvinic acid derivatives, like variegatic, xerocomic, and atrotomentinic acids.

Taxonomy
Boletaceae were first described by the French botanist François Fulgis Chevallier in 1826, as a family distinct from Agaricaceae. Five genera were initially included in Chevallier's circumscription: Boletus (which is the type genus of the family), Cladoporus (now synonymous with Laetiporus), Physisporus (now Perenniporia), Polyporus, and Fistulina. However, all of the original genera except Boletus have since been transferred to different families, and several new Boletaceae genera have been described.

Genera
Rolf Singer, in the 4th edition (1986) of his Agaricales in Modern Taxonomy, included 26 genera and 415 species in Boletaceae. In the Dictionary of the Fungi (10th edition, 2008), 35 Boletaceae genera were recognised, which collectively contained 787 species. Molecular phylogenetic studies in the 2000s have revised the concept of the family; in a highly cited 2006 publication, Manfred Binder and David Hibbett recognised 38 genera within the family, many of which had remained at the time undescribed. The number of Boletaceae genera increased significantly in the following years, as some of the early-established genera (Boletus, Leccinum, Xerocomus), further revealed to be highly polyphyletic. In the comprehensive work of Wu and colleagues (2014), seven major clades at subfamily level and 59 generic lineages were uncovered, including four new subfamilies (Austroboletoideae, Chalciporoideae, Leccinoideae, and Zangioideae) and 22 potential new genera. To formally name the generic lineages unravelled by molecular phylogenies, several new genera have since been described from Asia, Europe and North America including, among others, Baorangia, Butyriboletus, Cacaoporus, Caloboletus, Exsudoporus, Imperator and Rubroboletus.

Some characters traditionally emphasised in morphology-based taxonomy, such as basidiospore ornamentation and "stuffed" pore morphology, revealed to be incongruent with molecular taxonomy, suggesting that certain traits evolved more than once within the family.

(*) Note that the phylogenetic and taxonomic position of many taxa currently remaining in genus Boletus has not yet been clarified. The number of species in this genus will therefore significantly reduce in the following years, as more taxa will be transferred to different genera, or found to be synonyms.

Many other genera formerly part of this family have been moved into other, smaller families, as work with molecular phylogeny shows that they are more distantly related, even if morphologically similar.  Representative of this adjustment, is the move of the slimy-capped genus Suillus to the family Suillaceae.

Distribution

Boletes are found worldwide, on every continent except Antarctica. Well-known and well-described in the temperate latitudes in the northern hemisphere, newer research has shown significant diversity in tropical and southern hemisphere regions as well. E. J. H. Corner found evidence of at least 60 species on the island of Singapore alone. In 1972 he described 140 species from the Malay Peninsula and Borneo and estimated there were at least as many yet to be documented. Over 100 species belonging to 52 genera have been reported from China, which has emerged as one of the worldwide hotspots of Boletaceae diversity. The family is also reasonably well-represented in the Mediterranean region, where many rare or range-restricted species can be found.

Ecology

As heterotrophic organisms, the majority Boletaceae species are symbiotic, and form mutually beneficial ectomycorrhizal associations with various trees and shrubs. However, a number of ancestral species in genera Buchwaldoboletus and Pseudoboletus, are saprotrophic or parasitic. Evidence suggests that some, if not all, species of Chalciporus might also have a mycoparasitic interaction with other fungi. The exact trophic status of some South American and African boletes, such as species of Phylloboletellus, is nonetheless not yet fully clarified, as fruit bodies are often found without the presence of ectomycorrhizal vegetation.

Most frequently associated tree-hosts are members of the Fagaceae, particularly oak (Quercus), beech (Fagus) and chestnut (Castanea). Fewer species are associated with conifers, mostly spruce (Picea) and fir (Abies). In the Mediterranean region, most boletes are strongly associated with evergreen oaks, particularly members of the "Ilex" group, such as the holm oak (Quercus ilex), the kermes oak (Q. coccifera), or the golden oak (Q. alnifolia). Some boletes are also known to grow in association with Cistaceae shrubs, mainly Cistus and Helianthemum, and at least one species (Leccinellum corsicum) is exclusively associated with rockrose.

Most boletes are sensitive to cold and fruit during warm spells in the summer and early months of the autumn, while some have very specific preferences with regards to substrate. For instance, the highly sought after Boletus aereus is mostly found on acidic soils, whereas the poisonous Rubroboletus satanas is predominantly calciphilous and mostly occurs on chalk. Other species, such as Hemileccinum impolitum or Leccinellum lepidum, are indifferent to the substrate and frequently occur on both calcareous and acidic soil.

Conservation

A number of Boletaceae species are considered rare, vulnerable or endangered, and some have been included in regional or national Red Lists. Rubroboletus dupainii is listed among the 33 threatened fungi of Europe, as part of Appendix I of the Bern Convention. Rubroboletus rhodoxanthus is considered extinct in England and critically endangered in the Czech Republic. Also critically endangered in the Czech Republic are Aureoboletus moravicus, Buchwaldoboletus sphaerocephalus, Butyriboletus fuscoroseus, Imperator rhodopurpureus, Leccinum roseotinctum and Rubroboletus rubrosanguineus. Eleven species of Boletaceae, Boletus aereus, Boletus pinophilus, Butyriboletus regius, Hemileccinum impolitum, Imperator luteocupreus, I. rhodopurpureus, I. torosus, Rubroboletus dupainii, R. lupinus, R. pulchrotinctus and R. satanas, are considered vulnerable or endangered in North Macedonia and have been included in the national Red List of fungi. Similarly, twenty species of Boletaceae are included in the Red List of fungi in Bulgaria.

Research from the Mediterranean region suggests that many boletes might be under threat from accelerated climate changes and long-term drought. In a ten-year study from the island of Cyprus, most bolete species were found to be rare, highly restricted by low soil moisture and exhibited very erratic fruiting patterns strongly correlating to annual, late summer and early autumn precipitation.

Edibility
A large number of boletes are edible, few are delicious and some are considered to be true culinary delicacies. The much sought after king bolete (Boletus edulis), in particular, is a species of high commercial value and has been described as "the wild mushroom par excellence". In the Province of Parma in northern Italy, the four most sought after boletes, Boletus edulis, B. aereus, B. reticulatus and B. pinophilus, have been collected and commercially exploited for centuries. Boletes are widely collected and sold in markets throughout Spain, particularly the province of Aragon. Scandinavian cuisine praises boletes.  They are a regular feature of Finnish cuisine and, especially the king bolete, is considered an unsurpassed culinary mushroom, widely used in various soups, sauces, casseroles and hotpots. Bolete mushrooms are sometimes also used as pizza topping, not unlike champignons, shiitake, or portobellos.

Two species of Butyriboletus, the royal bolete (B. regius) and the butter bolete (B. appendiculatus) are also culinary valued, though much less common than the ceps. In northern Europe, two of the commonest and most frequently collected edible boletes are the bay bolete (Imleria badia), whose pores bruise blue-green, and the orange birch bolete, which is a Leccinum with an orange cap and which bruises a bluish grey.

Several guidebooks recommend avoiding all red-pored boletes, but both Neoboletus luridiformis (= Neoboletus erythropus) and Suillellus luridus are edible when well-cooked and widely consumed in certain parts of Europe.

Lookalikes
Poisonous or otherwise inedible species are also present in the family, however, such as the unpalatable bitter species Caloboletus calopus and the aptly named bitter bolete (Tylopilus felleus), with a taste compared to bile, as well as some orange-capped species of Leccinum. As the bitter bolete resembles somewhat the king bolete, it can produce literally a bitter disappointment to the mushroom hunter. The rule of thumb is that the bitter bolete has pink pores, and a brownish stipe with a dark brown (sometimes approaching black) reticulum, while the cep has whitish pores, which in maturity become yellowish or sometimes with a faint olivaceous tint, a light-colored (white and/or similar in color to the rest of the stipe) reticulum and white hyphae tufts at the base of the stipe.  The bitter bolete also lacks the stuffed or plugged pore appearance (caused by a hyphal mat of cheilocystidia) that is common in the cep and its allies. If uncertain, tasting a small piece of cap context should clinch the identification, since Tylopilus felleus has a strong, foul bitter taste.

Toxicity

Rubroboletus satanas has long been considered to be poisonous, though it is not known to have been responsible for any fatalities and the symptoms are predominantly gastrointestinal in nature. A glycoprotein, bolesatine, is thought to be responsible for the poisonings. When given to mice, Bolesatine causes massive thrombosis, while at lower concentrations it is a mitogen, inducing cell division to human T lymphocytes. A similar compound, bolevenine, has been isolated from the poisonous Neoboletus venenatus in Japan.

More recent studies have associated the poisoning caused by R. satanas with hyperprocalcitonemia, and classified it as a distinct syndrome among fungal poisonings. Several other boletes are known to cause varying degrees of gastrointestinal symptoms, especially if eaten raw or insufficiently cooked.

One incident of death associated with Rubroboletus pulcherrimus was reported in 1994; a couple developed gastrointestinal symptoms after eating this fungus, with the husband finally succumbing. An autopsy revealed infarction of the midgut.

See also

 Bolete eater
 List of North American boletes

References

Cited texts

External links

 
Basidiomycota families
Taxa named by François Fulgis Chevallier
Taxa described in 1826